Scrinium is a genus of sea snails, marine gastropod mollusks in the family Mitromorphidae, in the superfamily Conoidea the cone snails and their allies.

Description
The small shell is oblong and rounded at each end. It contains only a few whorls. The low protoconch is dome-shaped. The colour is yellow and brown, uniform or variegated. There is no differentiation of the fasciole area. The sculpture consists of obscure radial ribs and faint spiral grooves. The aperture is rather wide and smooth within. The sinus is shallow. The outer lip is simple. The siphonal canal is short and wide, with an everted margin. The columella is concave and twisted.

Distribution
The species in this genus occur off Australia and New Zealand. Fossils have been found off New Zealand, age range: 37.2 to 15.9 Ma.

Species
 † Scrinium blandiatum (Suter, 1917) 
 Scrinium brazieri (E. A. Smith, 1892)
 † Scrinium callimorphum (Suter, 1917) 
 † Scrinium finlayi Powell, 1942 
 Scrinium furtivum Hedley, 1922
 Scrinium gatliffi (Verco, 1909) 
 Scrinium impendens (Verco, 1909)
 † Scrinium limbatum Maxwell, 1992 
 Scrinium neozelanicum (Suter, 1908)
 † Scrinium ordinatum (Hutton, 1877) 
 † Scrinium stirophorum Suter, 1917 
 † Scrinium strongi Marwick, 1931 
 † Scrinium thomsoni Powell, 1942 
 Species brought into synonymy
 Scrinium neozelanica [sic] : synonym of Scrinium neozelanicum (Suter, 1908)
 Scrinium sandersonae Bucknill, 1928: synonym of Neoguraleus sandersonae (Bucknill, 1928)

References

 Powell, A.W.B. 1966. The molluscan families Speightiidae and Turridae, an evaluation of the valid taxa, both Recent and fossil, with list of characteristic species. Bulletin of the Auckland Institute and Museum. Auckland, New Zealand 5: 1–184, pls 1–23
 Bouchet P., Kantor Yu.I., Sysoev A. & Puillandre N. (2011) A new operational classification of the Conoidea. Journal of Molluscan Studies 77: 273-308.

External links

 
Mitromorphidae
Gastropod genera